Castorina is an Italian surname. Notable people with the surname include:

Gianpaolo Castorina (born 1976), Italian soccer player and coach
Ronald Castorina, American politician

See also
Castoria (disambiguation)

Italian-language surnames